Genov is a Bulgarian surname derived from the personal name Geno and may refer to:

Daniel Genov (footballer born 1985), Bulgarian footballer
Daniel Genov (footballer born 1989), Bulgarian footballer
Nikolai Genov (born 1946), Bulgarian sociologist
Petar Genov (born 1970), Bulgarian chess player
Nikolay Genov (born 1997), Bulgarian male track cyclist
Spas Genov (born 1981), Bulgarian boxer
Dimitar Genov (born 1947), Bulgarian equestrian
Stefan Genov (born 1957), Bulgarian football manager

Bulgarian-language surnames
Patronymic surnames